The Vulture is director Yaky Yosha's third feature, first screened in 1981. Its release, not long before the first war in Lebanon, dealt with the problematic immortalization industry resultant from young war casualties. The film provoked great controversy among the Israeli public, which felt it has crossed a blood-red line. The Israeli censors cut The Vulture, but when selected to represent the country at the Cannes Film Festival, it was screened uncut.

Plot
Boaz, a young officer, returns home from the Yom Kippur War (1973). He left for the war with two friends and returned with one dead and one badly injured. Down and out and lonely, Boaz aimlessly wanders the streets of Tel-Aviv. To comfort himself, Boaz goes to console his dead friend's parents, only to find himself sucked into a most complex relationship with the bereaved parents. First out of courtesy, then out of cynicism, Boaz gives them all they are missing: a poem their son allegedly wrote, false tales of heroism and some occasional snapshots. Out of thin air Boaz erects a false monument of a dead hero out of a fairly mediocre child, who did not get to leave much behind him.

Before long, Boas is running a full scale immortalization industry, “manufacturing” for each bereaved family a creative, sensitive son. A soldier and a poet. Boaz becomes romantically involved with his dead friend's girlfriend, and simultaneously with the beautiful coordinator in the army's memorial department. And so, by day they serve a holy trinity of comfort and immortality and by night they are fallen angels, ménage à trois.  Before too long, the next war breaks out. Boaz is called again for duty. Now an older, experienced officer, Boaz makes sure every single soldier in his company carries in his pocket a personal poem, just in case.

The Vulture represented Israel at the Cannes Festival 1981.

External links 
 

1981 films
1981 drama films
1980s Hebrew-language films
Films directed by Yaky Yosha
Censorship in Israel
Film controversies in Israel
Films about the Israel Defense Forces
Films set in 1973
Israeli drama films